Columbia Historic District II is a national historic district located at Columbia, South Carolina.  The district encompasses 113 contributing buildings and 1 contributing site in a former residential section of Columbia. They were built between the early-19th century and the 1930s (majority between 1900 and 1918) and are now mostly used for commercial purposes.  The buildings are in the Greek Revival, Gothic Revival, Classical Revival, and the “Columbia Cottage” styles.  Notable buildings include the Robert Mills House, Debruhl-Marshall House, Hampton-Preston House, Episcopal Church of the Good Shepherd, Crawford-Clarkson House, Maxcy Gregg House, Hale-Elmore-Seibels House, St. Paul's Lutheran Church, and Ebenezer Lutheran Church.

It was added to the National Register of Historic Places in 1971.  It was enlarged in 1982, and underwent a boundary adjustment in 2018.

References

External links

Historic districts on the National Register of Historic Places in South Carolina
Buildings and structures in Columbia, South Carolina
National Register of Historic Places in Columbia, South Carolina